Sir Melville Leslie Macnaghten  (16 June 1853, Woodford, London −12 May 1921) was Assistant Commissioner (Crime) of the London Metropolitan Police from 1903 to 1913. A highly regarded and famously affable figure of the late Victorian and Edwardian eras he played major investigative roles in cases that led to the establishment and acceptance of fingerprint identification. He was also a major player in the pursuit and capture of Dr. Crippen, and of the exoneration of a wrongly convicted man, Adolph Beck, which helped lead to the creation of the Court of Criminal Appeal in 1907.

When he prematurely retired in 1913 due to illness, Macnaghten claimed to journalists that he knew the exact identity of Jack the Ripper, the nickname of the unknown serial killer of poor prostitutes in London's impoverished East End during the late Victorian era. The police chief called the killer "that remarkable man", but refused to name him or divulge details that might identify him, except to reveal that he had taken his own life at the end of 1888. Macnaghten further claimed that he had destroyed the relevant papers to keep forever secret the deceased killer's identity. Since 1965, the public has known that Macnaghten's suspect was Montague John Druitt, a country doctor's son and young barrister who inexplicably drowned himself in the River Thames in early December 1888. The source of Macnaghten's alleged "private information" about Druitt has two candidates, both only uncovered in the early 21st century. One is a Tory politician, H. R. Farquharson, who lived near the Druitts and also went to Eton with Macnaghten, and the other is Colonel Sir Vivian Majendie, a very close friend of the police chief and whose clan was related to the Druitt family. It is likely both men, in succession, were the unnamed sources of information for the police chief regarding the drowned barrister being strongly suspected of being the Ripper by his closest relations.

Since 1959, Macnaghten has been known for a major report written in the 1890s on the Ripper case, naming three possible Jack the Ripper suspects. There are two versions of this document, one that was filed in the archives of Scotland Yard. It was, however, a copy of the privately held version in the possession of his daughter, Christabel, Lady Aberconway – the version which strongly advocated "M. J. Druitt" as the likeliest suspect to have been the Whitechapel assassin – that was revealed in 1959. Macnaghten's opinion that the case was likely solved, and that it was a "Protean" maniac who had taken his own life, had already been confirmed in his 1914 memoir, "Days of My Years" (London, Edward Arnold) though Druitt was not named (and no other suspects are mentioned as possibilities).

More recently, French writer Sophie Herfort has argued that Macnaghten himself was responsible for the Jack the Ripper murders.

Early career
The youngest of fifteen children of Elliot Macnaghten, the last Chairman of the British East India Company, Macnaghten was educated at Eton. In his memoirs he describes his schooldays as the happiest of his life, even going so far as to write that he knew this to be so as he lived them. After leaving school in 1872, he went to India to run his father's tea estates in Bengal and remained there until 1888, albeit with occasional visits back home. In 1881 he was assaulted by Indian land rioters and as a result, became friends with James Monro, who was District Judge and Inspector-General in the Bombay Presidency at the time.

On 3 October 1878 he married Dora Emily Sanderson, the daughter of a canon from Chichester; they eventually had two sons and two daughters (Christabel was the second, 1890–1974).

Career in the Criminal Investigation Department
Upon his return to England, Macnaghten was offered the post of first Assistant Chief Constable (CID) in the Metropolitan Police by Monro, who by that time had become the first Assistant Commissioner (Crime); however this appointment was opposed by Charles Warren, the Commissioner of Police of the Metropolis, allegedly due to the beating he took by "the Hindoos" back in Bengal; but the real reason seemed to be that Warren and Monro did not get along well from the beginning. Warren's rejection of Macnaghten widened the rift between the two men, resulting in Monro's resignation and his transfer to Special Branch by the Home Secretary, Henry Matthews.

However, due to the continuous disagreements with Home Secretary Matthews, Commissioner Warren chose to resign on 9 November 1888. Monro was brought in to succeed him as Commissioner. With this turn of events, Macnaghten was brought in with the position of Assistant Chief Constable in June 1889; he was later promoted to Chief Constable in 1890, following the unexpected death of the first incumbent, Adolphus Williamson.

Macnaghten and Jack the Ripper

 

Even though he missed being on the police force during the Ripper killings of 1888, Macnaghten was actively involved in the investigation of the murders of Whitechapel prostitutes between 1889 and 1891. Crimes that were initially believed by some at Scotland Yard, and certainly by the tabloid press, to be by the same perpetrator. In his memoir, Macnaghten claimed that information received "some years after" the final murder of 1888 led him to the belief that Jack the Ripper was a man who had taken his own life at the end of that year. The source of these "certain facts" that led to this "conclusion" is unidentified, though he implies in his book that it was the murderer's "own people", e.g. his relations who supposedly lived with him) who must have privately briefed the Chief Constable. Macnaghten even titles his chapter on the Whitechapel murders: "Laying the Ghost of Jack the Ripper"; meaning that the deceased "fiend" had only haunted Londoners as they were in ignorance that the killer had been in his grave for several years.

In February 1891 a Conservative MP, Henry Richard Farquharson, the member for West Dorset, was telling people in London that he knew the murderer to have been a surgeon's son who had committed suicide. This story leaked to the press, though it never became a sensation. Like Macnaghten, Farquharson was a member of the upper classes who had attended Eton College and owned estates in the Far East. Macnaghten also had a potentially personal conduit of accurate information about Druitt – a close friend at the Home Office, Colonel Vivian Majendie (knighted in 1895). Colonel Majendie was also from a very distinguished family, was Chief Inspector of Munitions (1871–1898) and was justly acclaimed for his persistent bravery as a bomb disposal expert. Majendie was also related by the marriage of his first cousin's daughter, Isabel Majendie Hill, to the alleged Ripper (in 1888 Isabel had married Reverend Charles Druitt, the first cousin of Montague). According to Macnaghten, Druitt's own family "believed" he was Jack the Ripper. Due to speculation in the press about another madman, Macnaghten wrote a confidential report dated 23 February 1894 naming Druitt as a Ripper suspect and placed it on file. This document, in its entirety, was not publicly available until 1975 (the section mentioning only the suspects had been published in 1966). The alternate version of this same document, believed by many to be a draft, has never been sighted by a researcher and is thought to be lost. Instead a copy of this second version was made by Macnaghten's daughter Christabel, Lady Aberconway, who allowed some of its contents to be publicly broadcast by television presenter Daniel Farson in 1959. The name of the chief suspect was not revealed until 1965, by the American journalist and author Tom Cullen. Why Macnaghten composed two versions remains the subject of controversy, speculation and historical debate among writers on the Ripper mystery (some have argued that the so-called Aberconway version is a rewrite of the 1894 original). This report proved influential for Jack the Ripper research, for it popularised the idea that the Ripper only had five true victims and also named three possible suspects.

It has been widely believed for over half a century that Macnaghten, in writing from memory, committed many factual errors in his report regarding Druitt. For example, in the privately held version he inaccurately describes Druitt as a 41-year-old doctor who vanished immediately after the final murder on 9 November 1888. In fact, Druitt was functioning normally, at least outwardly, at his places of work and play until the end of November 1888. This document also says that his family only "suspected" he was the Ripper. Since 1959 it has also been treated as a foundation stone of so-called "Ripperology" that the timing of Druitt's suicide, so soon after the final murder, was the threadbare reason Macnaghten considered him a suspect at all. Yet this ignores that the police chief in his memoir, and from the relative safety of retirement, revealed that Scotland Yard believed Whitechapel prostitute murders after 1888 were also by the Ripper. Years later Druitt came to his attention due to information received that was judged, by Macnaghten, to be so credible that post-1888 murders could not exonerate the tragic barrister.

This line of argument is buttressed by the filed version of Macnaghten's report as he notably equivocates, writing that M. J. Druitt was only "said to be a doctor", whilst affirming that the suspect was definitely "sexually insane" and his family "believed" he was the killer. Notably, Frederick Abberline, the field detective who led the investigation, did not believe that Druitt was the Ripper. Macnaghten also makes a mistake in describing the drowned suspect a "young doctor" or "medical student" (some writers have wondered if Abberline was perhaps confusing Druitt with a Whitechapel suspect in 1888 who was a young, medical student, named John Sanders). A controversial new line of argument is that the police chief was engaged in a campaign of "spin"; to both reveal and conceal the identity of the murderer. Commendably Macnaghten wanted the public to know that the Ripper was an English, gentile gentleman and not a poor, Jewish immigrant, yet he also supposedly conspired with the most famous writer of the day, George R. Sims, to disguise the drowned, young barrister as a drowned, middle-aged surgeon. They did this to protect the late suspect's respectable relations (Sims was also an upper class friend of both Macnaghten and Majendie). In effect Macnaghten and Sims disguised Druitt as "Dr. Jekyll and Mr. Hyde" (even Druitt's family in Sims's regular column in "The Referee" were disguised as unnamed "friends" of the "mad doctor").

Curiously, Douglas G. Browne in his The Rise of Scotland Yard, states that Macnaghten "appears to identify the Ripper with the leader of a plot to assassinate Mr Balfour at the Irish Office." This reference is puzzling because, although there were Fenian plots to assassinate Balfour, Druitt is not known to have had any such connections and it is extremely unlikely that he did. It has been recently speculated that Browne may have taken too literally some lines by Macnaghten at the end of his Ripper chapter. Macnaghten exaggerates the negative impact on the authorities of being unable to catch the fiend. He alleges it caused the resignation of the Police Commissioner and  "... very nearly settled the hash of one of Her Majesty's principal Secretaries of State." Macnaghten means the near-resignation of the Home Secretary, but Browne has perhaps misinterpreted these ambiguous words as an allusion to the assassination plot against Balfour.

The second of Macnaghten's three suspects was identified only as "Kosminski," presumably Aaron Kosminski, a Polish Jew who lived in Whitechapel and was committed to an insane asylum in 1891. While not on the top of Macnaghten's list, Kosminski was suspected by Sir Robert Anderson, the man who succeeded Monro as Assistant Commissioner, with apparent confirmation by Chief Inspector Donald Swanson, Anderson's desk officer. As with Druitt, definitive evidence is lacking to support this allegation, and both Anderson and Swanson also made errors about Kosminski, their preferred suspect (the most significant of which was to claim "Kosminski" was long deceased when he was still alive; they also claim he was positively identified by a Jewish witness who refused to testify, often thought to be Israel Schwartz, a claim publicly and explicitly rejected by police chief Major Henry Smith, and implicitly by Macnaghten via his proxies and in his memoirs).

The third suspect in Macnaghten's report was a man named Michael Ostrog, a Russian-born thief and con man who affected several aliases and disguises and was detained in asylums on several occasions. Again there is little to support this suspicion against Ostrog: records indicated that he was imprisoned in France during the murders. The fact that Ostrog was arrested and imprisoned before the report was written raises the question of why Ostrog was included at all as a viable suspect. A possible yet tenuous answer has been postulated involving Eton College. Ostrog had stolen from Macnaghten's beloved alma mater and the police chief may have included the Russian in his reports as a private act of revenge. From late 1894 Macnaghten had to know that Ostrog had been cleared of the Whitechapel crimes, yet he still persisted with his inclusion and, what is more, projection into the public sphere of Ostrog as a Ripper suspect (via literary cronies).

Later career, including as Assistant Commissioner
In 1900 Macnaghten served in the Belper Committee to inquire about "the working of the method of Identification of Criminals by Measurement and Fingerprints". As the committee recommended the use of fingerprints as a means of identification over bertillonage, largely due to the testimony of Edward Henry on their respective merits.

When Henry was appointed Commissioner in 1903, succeeding Sir Edward Bradford, Macnaghten was appointed Assistant Commissioner (Crime) and became involved in many of the most famous cases in the history of the Metropolitan Police, including the Hawley Harvey Crippen case and the Farrow double murder case, which resulted in the conviction and hanging of Albert and Alfred Stratton largely on the basis on fingerprint evidence. He also claimed in his memoirs to have found the critical female witness who exonerated the falsely convicted Adolf Beck, a notorious mis-carriage of justice which led to the creation of the Court of Criminal Appeal.

Macnaghten was knighted in the 1907 King's Birthday Honours List. In the 1912 New Years Honours List, he was appointed Companion of the Order of the Bath (CB). He was awarded the King's Police Medal (KPM) in the 1913 New Years Honours List. He was also a Knight Commander of the White Military Order of Spain and a Commander of the Order of the Dannebrog.

Retirement and later life
However, in 1911 Macnaghten was experiencing the first signs of ill-health; even a trip to Australia the following year failed to improve matters. He was forced to retire from his job in 1913. Macnaghten's successor at Scotland Yard was Basil Thomson who had attended New College, Oxford at the same time as Montague John Druitt, Macnaghten's preferred Ripper suspect.

In 1914 he published his memoirs Days of My Years. He also made a translation of Horace's Ars Poetica into English verse, an effort to which he devoted the last ten years of his life.

Macnaghten died on 12 May 1921 at Queen Anne's Mansions, Westminster.

Macnaghten in fiction
During his lifetime Sir Melville Macnaghten was fictionalised in several novels. He appears as a character named Mr Johnson in George R. Sims' 'Dorcas Dene Detective' (1897) short stories. Both Macnaghten and George R. Sims appear in Marie Belloc-Lowndes 'The Lodger:A story of the London fog' (1911), the latter as himself though unnamed and the former as Police Commissioner Sir John Burney. Macnaghten also is arguably the model for the heroic private eye Edmund Blake who hunts the Whitechapel murderer in Guy Logan's 'The true history of Jack the Ripper' (1905) in which Montague Druitt is also disguised as Mortimer Slade. Macnaghten also appears in The Adventures of Inspector Lestrade (1985), the first of the Inspector Lestrade novels by M. J. Trow.  The book deals with the aftermath of the Ripper case and with Macnaghten's report. Trow misspells Macnaghten's name as "McNaghten" in his book and presents a fictional version of Macnaghten's daughter.

Macnaghten also features prominently in the later chapters of Alan Moore's seminal graphic novel From Hell.

Footnotes

External links
Casebook.org

 

Assistant Commissioners of Police of the Metropolis
Knights Bachelor
Companions of the Order of the Bath
English recipients of the Queen's Police Medal
Metropolitan Police recipients of the Queen's Police Medal
1853 births
1921 deaths
People educated at Eton College